Fényszóró ('Spotlight') was a weekly publication on theatre and films, published from Budapest, Hungary between 1945 and 1946. The publication had a socialist orientation. Béla Balázs became the editor of the weekly in the fall of 1945.

References

1945 establishments in Hungary
1946 disestablishments in Hungary
Defunct magazines published in Hungary
Film magazines
Hungarian-language magazines
Weekly magazines published in Hungary
Magazines established in 1945
Magazines disestablished in 1946
Magazines published in Budapest
Socialist magazines
Theatre magazines